The 2008 Ivy League Baseball Championship Series took place at Red Rolfe Field at Biondi Park in Hanover, New Hampshire on May 6 and 7, 2008.  The series matched the regular season champions of each of the league's two divisions.  , the winner of the series, claimed the Ivy League's automatic berth in the 2008 NCAA Division I baseball tournament.  It was Columbia's first Championship Series victory.

Dartmouth made their fourth appearance in the Championship Series, and first since 2004.  They had yet to win the event.

Results

References

Ivy League Baseball Championship Series
Tournament
Ivy League Baseball Championship Series